Chen Zhu (born August 17, 1953) is a Chinese hematologist, molecular biologist, and politician. He is the president of the Red Cross Society of China. He served as a vice chairman of the Standing Committee of the National People's Congress, from 2013 to 2023. He was also the chairman of the Chinese Peasants' and Workers' Democratic Party from 2012 to 2022. He formerly served as China's Minister of Health. Chen also holds a professorship at the School of Medicine of Shanghai Jiao Tong University.

Biography
Chen was born in Shanghai in August 1953 and his ancestral hometown is Zhenjiang, Jiangsu Province.

Chen began his medical career by spending five years in rural China as a barefoot doctor. Chen then obtained his master's degree from the Shanghai Second Medical Sciences University (now the medical school of Shanghai Jiao Tong University) in September, 1981. He obtained his Ph.D. from the Paris Diderot University (Paris 7) in Paris, France. Chen completed his medical residency and postdoctoral research at the same university and its teaching hospital.

Chen is former President of the Shanghai Institute of Hematology and former Director-general of the China Human Genome Center (South) in Shanghai.

Honors and awards
Chen is an Academician of the Chinese Academy of Sciences, foreign associate of the United States National Academy of Sciences, foreign member of the US Institute of Medicine, foreign member of the French Academy of Sciences, and a member of The World Academy of Sciences (TWAS). Chen is also a Member of the European Academy of Arts, Sciences and Humanities. He was elected an Honorary Fellows of the UK Academy of Medical Sciences in 2008.

Chen was awarded the State Scientific and Technological Award by the Chinese government and the "Prix de l'Qise" by "La Ligue Nationale contre le Cancer" of France (he is the first non-French winner).

In 2002, Chen received the Légion d'honneur from French Government. In 2005, Chen was given an honorary doctor of science by the University of Hong Kong.

In 2010, Chen was awarded an honorary degree (Doctor of the University) by the University of York, UK, at a ceremony in Beijing.

In 2012, Chen was awarded the 7th Annual Szent-Györgyi Prize for Progress in Cancer Research by the National Foundation for Cancer Research. He was elected as a Fellow of the Royal Society in 2013.

In 2018, Chen was awarded the Sjöberg Prize by the Royal Swedish Academy of Sciences “for the clarification of molecular mechanisms and the development of a revolutionary treatment for acute promyelocytic leukaemia”. He shared the prize and the prize amount of one million US dollars with cancer researchers Anne Dejean and Hugues de Thé.

U.S. sanctions 
On Dec 8, 2020, Chen Zhu, together with all 13 other vicechairpersons of the National People's Congress of China was designated by US Department of State as connected with the National Security Law (NSL), pursuant to Executive Order (E.O.) 13936, “The President’s Executive Order on Hong Kong Normalization.”, and added to OFAC's SDN List.

Family
Chen Zhu's father Chen Jialun and mother Xu Manyin are both prominent doctors and medical professors in Shanghai. He is the eldest of three children. His youngest brother, Chen Zhen (1955–2000), was a globally recognized artist based in France. He also has a sister named Chen Jian. Chen Zhu's wife Chen Saijuan is also a well-known hematologist and an academician of the Chinese Academy of Engineering. The couple have a son. Both Chen and his wife studied under Wang Zhenyi.

References 

1953 births
Living people
20th-century Chinese physicians
21st-century Chinese physicians
Biologists from Shanghai
Chairperson and vice chairpersons of the Standing Committee of the 12th National People's Congress
Chairperson and vice chairpersons of the Standing Committee of the 13th National People's Congress
Chinese Peasants' and Workers' Democratic Party politicians
Chinese hematologists
Chinese molecular biologists
Chevaliers of the Légion d'honneur
Educators from Shanghai
Foreign associates of the National Academy of Sciences
Foreign Members of the Royal Society
Individuals sanctioned by the United States under the Hong Kong Autonomy Act
Members of the Chinese Academy of Sciences
Members of the National Academy of Medicine
Paris Diderot University alumni
People's Republic of China politicians from Shanghai
Physicians from Shanghai
Red Cross Society of China
Shanghai Jiao Tong University alumni
Academic staff of Shanghai Jiao Tong University